Princess Louise Françoise Marie Laure of Orléans (24 February 1882 – 18 April 1958) was a Princess of the Two-Sicilies and paternal great grandmother of King Felipe VI of Spain.

Louise was the youngest daughter  of Philippe d'Orléans (1838–1894), Count of Paris and claimant to the French throne as "Philippe VII". Her mother was Princess Marie Isabelle d'Orléans (1848–1919), daughter of Antoine, Duke of Montpensier, and Infanta Luisa Fernanda of Spain.

Marriage and issue
On 16 November 1907, Louise married in Wood Norton, Evesham, Worcestershire, UK, Infante Carlos, Prince of Bourbon-Two Sicilies (1870–1949), and widower of María de las Mercedes, Princess of Asturias. The couple lived in Madrid and had 4 children:

 Prince Carlos of Bourbon-Two Sicilies (1908–1936). Killed in the Spanish Civil War fighting on the Nationalist side.
 Princess María de los Dolores of Bourbon-Two Sicilies (1909–1996). In 1937, she married Prince Augustyn Józef Czartoryski (1907–1946) and had one surviving son, Adam. She remarried to Carlos Chías Ossorio on 1950.
 Princess María de las Mercedes of Bourbon-Two Sicilies (1910–2000) who married Infante Juan, Count of Barcelona and became the mother of  King Juan Carlos I of Spain, who abdicated in favor of his son in 2014.
 Princess María de la Esperanza of Bourbon-Two Sicilies (1914–2005), who married Prince Pedro Gastão of Orléans-Braganza.

Later life
In 1931, when the Second Spanish Republic was proclaimed, the family left Spain for Italy and later Switzerland. In 1939, after the victory of Francisco Franco in the Spanish Civil War, they returned to Spain and settled in Seville.

Heraldry

Ancestry

References

 Généalogie des rois et des princes by Jan-Charles Volkmann Edit. Jean-Paul Gisserot (1998)

1882 births
1958 deaths
19th-century French people
20th-century French people
19th-century French women
20th-century French women
Princesses of Bourbon-Two Sicilies
Princesses of France (Orléans)
People from Cannes
Children of Prince Philippe, Count of Paris